Fernando Manuel Silva Couto  (born 2 August 1969) is a Portuguese former footballer who played as a centre back.

During a 21-year professional career, he played in a number of top clubs in Portugal, Spain and Italy (12 seasons in the latter country), appearing in nearly 600 competitive matches and winning the double in each country, as well as three UEFA trophies.

At international level, Couto represented the Portugal national team in 110 games, taking part in the 2002 World Cup as well as three European Championships.

Club career
Born in Espinho near Porto, Couto joined FC Porto's youth system at the age of 17. On 2 June 1988, he made his first-team – and Primeira Liga – debut, playing 90 minutes in a 1–0 away win against Académica de Coimbra in what would be his only appearance of the season for the national champions. He was then released, spending one year apiece with F.C. Famalicão and Académica.

Couto returned to Porto in 1990, being an instrumental defensive unit in the conquest of six titles during his four-year spell. He subsequently moved to Italy with Parma AC, scoring a career-best four goals in 27 games in his first season and adding the campaign's UEFA Cup, in a 2–1 aggregate victory over fellow Serie A side Juventus F.C.

In summer 1996, Couto signed a four-year deal with FC Barcelona, moving alongside former Porto teammate Vítor Baía and English manager Bobby Robson as Luís Figo was also playing for the La Liga club. Regularly used during his early stint, he was less played by the next coach Louis van Gaal, but managed to appear in one of the two European finals the Catalans won, the 1996–97 edition of the UEFA Cup Winners' Cup.

After two seasons at the Camp Nou, Couto left Barça and joined Rome's S.S. Lazio in late June 1998 as teammate Iván de la Peña. He appeared in 22 matches in his first year to help his team to the second place in the league, and featured one minute in the final of the last Cup Winners' Cup, in a 2–1 win against RCD Mallorca at the Villa Park in Birmingham.

In 2001, Couto failed a doping test for the steroid nandrolone. He denied having taken forbidden substances, but his "B" test confirmed the finding and he eventually served four months out of a nine-month worldwide ban for the offence. He continued to appear regularly for Lazio in the following seasons.

In 2005, aged 36, Couto returned to Parma after 11 years as Lazio was unable to match his wage demands for a contract renewal. After two seasons of regular use he played just 17 matches in 2007–08, with the Emilia-Romagna side also suffering top-flight relegation; as his contract expired, he decided to retire from football.

In June 2010, two years after his retirement, Couto was named general manager at S.C. Braga. He was appointed the club's assistant manager for the 2012–13 campaign, leaving in February 2014.

International career
As a member of Famalicão in the third division, Couto appeared in four matches as Portugal won the 1989 FIFA World Youth Championship, being part of a group of players dubbed the "Golden Generation" of Portuguese football. He made his debut for the senior team on 19 December 1990, in a friendly with the United States played in Maia (1–0 win).

Always as first choice, Couto represented the nation at UEFA Euro 1996– scoring the game's only goal for the eventual quarter-finalists in a group stage fixture against Turkey– Euro 2000 and the 2002 FIFA World Cup, partnering former Porto teammate Jorge Costa in the last two tournaments, the latter of which ended in group stage exit.

Couto became the first Portuguese player to reach 100 caps (in a total of 110) on 11 October 2003, in a 5–3 friendly defeat of Albania. He was selected as captain for Euro 2004, which was played on home soil, starting in the first game against Greece but eventually being relegated to the bench by Ricardo Carvalho; Portugal went on to reach the final of the tournament, in which the team suffered a defeat against the same opponent.

Style of play
Consider as one of the greatest Portuguese defenders ever 
Couto usually played as a centre-back in zonal-marking system during his time with Porto, where he earned a reputation for being a tough and physical defender, with an aggressive and hard-tackling playing style. He was also known for his ability in the air, as well as his capacity to start quick attacking plays after winning back the ball. During his time in Italy, he also adapted himself to different tactical systems; under his Parma manager Nevio Scala, he featured as a man-marking centre-back – or stopper – on occasion, or even as a sweeper behind the back-line.

Career statistics

Club
Sources:

International
Source:

International goals
Source:

Honours
Porto
Primeira Divisão: 1987–88, 1991–92, 1992–93
Taça de Portugal: 1990–91, 1993–94
Supertaça Cândido de Oliveira: 1991, 1993

Parma
UEFA Cup: 1994–95

Barcelona
La Liga: 1997–98
Copa del Rey: 1996–97, 1997–98
Supercopa de España: 1996
UEFA Cup Winners' Cup: 1996–97
UEFA Super Cup: 1997

Lazio
Serie A: 1999–2000
Coppa Italia: 1999–2000, 2003–04
Supercoppa Italiana: 1998, 2000
UEFA Cup Winners' Cup: 1998–99
UEFA Super Cup: 1999

Portugal U20
FIFA U-20 World Cup: 1989

Portugal
UEFA European Championship runner-up: 2004

Orders
 Medal of Merit, Order of the Immaculate Conception of Vila Viçosa (House of Braganza)

See also
List of footballers with 100 or more caps
List of doping cases in sport

References

External links

PortuGOAL profile

1969 births
Living people
People from Espinho, Portugal
Portuguese footballers
Association football defenders
Primeira Liga players
Liga Portugal 2 players
FC Porto players
F.C. Famalicão players
Associação Académica de Coimbra – O.A.F. players
Serie A players
Parma Calcio 1913 players
S.S. Lazio players
La Liga players
FC Barcelona players
UEFA Cup winning players
Portugal youth international footballers
Portugal under-21 international footballers
Portugal international footballers
UEFA Euro 1996 players
UEFA Euro 2000 players
2002 FIFA World Cup players
UEFA Euro 2004 players
Portuguese expatriate footballers
Expatriate footballers in Italy
Expatriate footballers in Spain
Portuguese expatriate sportspeople in Italy
Portuguese expatriate sportspeople in Spain
FIFA Century Club
Doping cases in association football
Portuguese sportspeople in doping cases
Sportspeople from Aveiro District